Kalinin may refer to:
Mikhail Kalinin (1875–1946), Bolshevik revolutionary and Soviet functionary
Kalinin (surname)

Places
Kalinin, former name of Noramarg, Armenia
Kalinin, former name of Tashir, Armenia
Kalinin, former name of Burunqovaq, Azerbaijan
Kaliningrad Oblast, a federal subject and exclave of Russia located at the coast of the Baltic Sea.
Kaliningrad, the largest city and administrative center of the Kaliningrad Oblast
Kalinin, Russia, several inhabited localities in Russia
Kalinin, former name of Tver, Russia
Kalinin, Chuy, a village in Jayyl District, Chuy Region, Kyrgyzstan
Kalinin, Naryn, a village in At-Bashy District, Naryn Region, Kyrgyzstan
Kalinin, Osh, a village in Kara-Suu District, Osh Region, Kyrgyzstan
Poselok Imeni Kalinina, a town in Armenia
Kalinin, Bokhtar District, a town in Tajikistan
Kalinin, Hamadoni District, a town in Tajikistan

Aircraft and ships
Kalinin, original name under which the Kirov class Russian battlecruiser Admiral Nakhimov was commissioned
Soviet cruiser Kalinin
Aleksandrov-Kalinin AK-1, Soviet prototype airliner 
Kalinin K-4, Soviet Union airliner 
Kalinin K-5, Soviet Union airliner 
Kalinin K-7, an early experimental Soviet aircraft
Kalinin K-15, an early experimental Soviet aircraft
USS Kalinin Bay (CVE-68), a US Navy ship from World War II

Other uses
Kalinin Front, Red Army Group formation
Kalinin coal mine in Donetsk Oblast, Ukraine
Kalinin Nuclear Power Plant near Udomlya, Tver Oblast, Russian
Kalinin Machine-Building Plant near Yekaterinburg, Russia
2699 Kalinin, an asteroid
Laminin 332

See also
Kalininsky (disambiguation)